Rafaeli (רפאלי in Hebrew) is a surname of Italian origin, which means "son of Rafael". Spelling variations include Refaeli, Raphaeli, Raffaeli, and Raffaelli. The name may refer to:

Bar Refaeli (born 1985), Israeli model and actress
Daniele Raffaeli (born 1977), Italian actor
Eliezer Rafaeli (born 1926), Israeli founding President of the University of Haifa
Giacomo Raffaelli (1753–1836), Italian artist
Jean-François Raffaëlli (1850–1924), French painter
Philip Raffaelli (born 1955), British admiral
Ron Raffaelli (born 1945), American photographer
Anat Rafaeli (born 1954), Israeli organizational behavior researcher
Sheizaf Rafaeli (born 1955), Israeli computer scientist and writer
Shuli Mualem-Rafaeli (born 1965), Israeli politician
Zvi Raphaeli (1924–2005), Israeli painter

See also
Raffaello (disambiguation)

References

Jewish surnames
Italian-language surnames
Spanish-language surnames
Sephardic surnames